Angie Chabram-Dernersesian is a full professor at the University of California, Davis.

Life
She was reared by her mother and grew up in the San Gabriel Valley (California) along with three siblings. She attended St. Joseph’s elementary school and Bishop Amat Memorial High School. Like her two older brothers, nephew and aunt, she attended UC Berkeley. After traveling to Spain, Mexico and Puerto Rico as an undergraduate, she fulfilled a lifelong dream and obtained a Bachelor of Arts in Spanish in 1976. Professor Chabram-Dernersesian received the departmental commendation for excellence in Spanish and was the keynote speaker for the Chicana/o graduation. While at Berkeley, also helped to catalog the newspaper collection at The Chicana/o Studies Library.

Upon graduation, Professor Chabram-Dernersesian was admitted to the doctoral program of the Literature Department at the University of California at San Diego. Under the direction of Professor Rosaura Sánchez she pursued doctoral studies in the fields of Chicana/o, Mexican, and Latin American literature. As a graduate student Professor Chabram-Dernersesian also developed a keen interest in Chicana/o theory and criticism. She published seminal articles in this field after accepting a tenure-track position at the University of California at Davis in the Fall of 1984.

At UC Davis Professor Chabram-Dernersesian worked with students in the Spanish for Native Speakers Program and developed the Chicana/o Literature Series which emphasizes poetry, theater, and the novel. She also worked to develop the Chicana/o Studies Program, both in terms of its curriculum and faculty, and was instrumental in its acquisition of departmental status. As an Assistant Professor Chabram-Dernersesian was awarded a post-doctoral fellowship at the Institute of American Cultures/The Chicana/o Research Center. As a result of this fellowship and the collaborations it facilitated, her interest turned to cultural studies and she edited a special issue of the journal, Cultural Studies, (1990) in conjunction with Professor Rosa Linda Fregoso. She also published an entry for the book, Cultural Studies, edited by Lawrence Grossberg, Cary Nelson, and Paula Treichler (2002), as well as a number of other articles.

Her interest in cultural studies became central to a new research agenda which now focused on cultural representations of gender, identity, Chicana/o studies, race, ethnography, and multiculturalism. In 1999 Professor Chabram-Dernersesian edited a second special issue of Cultural Studies and was subsequently invited to participate in the special tribute to Stuart Hall, Without Guarantees (2000). In 2006 Professor Chabram-Dernersesian edited The Chicana/o Cultural Studies Reader (Routledge), which introduces readers to the contentious dialogues and alternative legacies of (Chicana/o) cultural studies with various critical entries. In 2007 she published what can be seen as a companion text: The Chicana/o Cultural Studies Forum (New York University Press). This Forum, which is the result of a number of interviews obtained and edited by Chabram-Dernersesian, includes lengthy introductions on the topic and a spoken intellectual history of the practices of Chicana/o cultural studies in our worlds. In addition, this edited book incorporates a valuable comparative context with the inclusion of interventions of practitioners from Black, American, Latina/o, Asian American, and Mexican cultural studies.

In 2008 Professor Chabram-Dernersesian turned her attention to cultural narrative and edited Speaking from the Body: Latinas on Health and Culture (University of Arizona Press) in collaboration with Adela de la Torre. This book argues that Latinas “experience illness within a narrative, or story, that gives meaning to what they are feeling, moment to moment” (Donald, 1998). Speaking from the Body also includes the stories of Latinas living with hypertension, breast cancer, obesity, diabetes, depression, osteoarthritis, rheumatoid arthritis, dementia, Parkinson’s, lupus, and hyper/hypothyroidism. In recognition of the importance of her work, Professor Chabram-Dernersesian was selected for the Davis Humanities Institute Seminar on Health, Medicine, and Culture in a Globalizing World.

Professor Angie Chabram-Dernersesian’s current research and teaching are firmly located in Chicana/o (feminist) cultural studies, a critical intervention which she views as including representations of the body, community, health, and illness. Generally speaking, she is interested in promoting transnational/ global cultural studies networks and collaborative work teams that provide critical literacy for marginalized and subaltern communities that have not had access to higher learning and are underrepresented within the primary of circuits of cultural production.

At the University of California at Davis Professor Chabram-Dernersesian focuses her attention on mentoring undergraduate as well as graduate students. She has consistently participated in the Murals Program, the Graduate Group of Cultural Studies, and the Designated Emphasis in Feminist Theory and Research. She hopes to collaborate with scholars and students alike to create a state of the arts curriculum that creates bridges instead of borders and challenges students to pursue education as a form of social inquiry and change. Her work as a Professor is inspired in the example of her mother who encouraged her children to work hard, do the best they could, and to go to high school and college—despite the odds. Her support ethic is credited to her sister whose consistent “presence” made it possible for her to seek a path of higher education.

Publications

References

1952 births
Living people
People from Los Angeles
University of California, Davis faculty
Hispanic and Latino American culture
Cultural academics
American social scientists
American literary critics